Group 4 of the 1930 FIFA World Cup began on 13 July 1930 and concluded on 20 July 1930. United States won the group, and advanced to the semi-finals. Paraguay and Belgium failed to advance.

Standings

Matches

United States vs Belgium
{{#invoke:transcludable section|main|section=4-1|text={{football box
|date = 13 July 1930
|time = 15:00 UYT (UTC−03:30)
|team1 = 
|score = 3–0
|report = Report
|team2 = 
|goals1 = McGhee Florie Patenaude |stadium = Estadio Parque Central, Montevideo
|attendance = 18,346
|referee = José Macías (Argentina)
}}}}

|
|valign="top" width="50%"|

|}

United States vs Paraguay
{{#invoke:transcludable section|main|section=4-2|text={{football box
|date = 17 July 1930
|time = 14:45 UYT (UTC−03:30)
|team1 = 
|score = 3–0
|report = Report
|team2 = 
|goals1 = Patenaude |stadium = Estadio Parque Central, Montevideo
|attendance = 18,306
|referee = José Macías (Argentina)
}}}}

|
|valign="top" width="50%"|

|}

Paraguay vs Belgium
{{#invoke:transcludable section|main|section=4-3|text={{football box
|date = 20 July 1930
|time = 15:00 UYT (UTC−03:30)
|team1 = 
|score = 1–0
|report = Report
|team2 = 
|goals1 = Vargas Peña |stadium = Estadio Centenario, Montevideo
|attendance = 12,000
|referee = Ricardo Vallarino (Uruguay)
}}}}

|
|valign="top" width="50%"|

|}

References

Group 4
Group
Group
Group